Schwenn is a surname. Notable people with the name include:

Helmuth Schwenn (1913–1983), German water polo 
John O. Schwenn (born 1949), American education administrator

See also
Dixon-Globe Opera House-Robinson-Schwenn Building, is a registered historic building in Hamilton, Ohio